"Too Hot" is a song by American singer Jason Derulo. It was released as a single on August 27, 2019, by Warner Records. The song was written by Andrew Morris, Everton Bonner, Ian Devaney, Jacob Manson, Jason Desrouleaux, John Taylor, Lisa Stansfield, Lloyd Willis and Sly Dunbar.

Music video
A music video to accompany the release of "Too Hot" was first released onto YouTube on September 3, 2019. The music video was directed by Derulo and was filmed in Los Angeles.

Personnel
Credits adapted from Tidal.

 Jacob Manson – producer, bass, guitar, writer
 Chris Gehringer – mastering
 Julián Vázquez – mixing
 Jason Derulo – vocals, writer
 Andrew Morris – writer
 Everton Bonner – writer
 Ian Devaney – writer
 John Taylor – writer
 Lisa Stansfield – writer
 Lloyd Willis – writer
 Sly Dunbar – writer

Charts

Release history

References

2019 songs
2019 singles
Jason Derulo songs
Songs written by Ian Devaney
Songs written by Lisa Stansfield
Songs written by Jacob Manson
Songs written by Jason Derulo